Brian Tucker is an American screenwriter and producer best known for his work on Broken City and Spawn.

Career 
Tucker gained notability from writing an unsolicited screenplay for Broken City (2013), which was bought by Mandate Pictures. The script became part of the film industry's 2008 black list of "best, albeit unproduced, screenplays." Speaking about the finished film, Emily Helwig of The Hollywood Reporter said "Tucker's screenplay might have been the problem and that it may have been a better story told as a period piece." Michael Phillips of the Chicago Tribune had issues with the "coincidence and improbability" of Tucker's script. In November 2019, it was announced that Tucker would serve as a screenwriter on a remake of The Fugitive. In August 2021, it was revealed that Tucker had been hired to rewrite Todd McFarlane's screenplay for the upcoming Spawn reboot. Tucker was also attached to write the screenplay for a Sympathy for Mr. Vengeance remake and an original film titled Expiration.

Filmography

References

External links 
 

21st-century American male writers
21st-century American screenwriters
American screenwriters
Living people
Year of birth missing (living people)